In the Land of the Rising Sun: Live in Japan 2001 is a live album by the English progressive rock band Renaissance. It was released in 2002 by Giant Electric Pea. The album was recorded in Tokyo, Japan in 2001.

Track listing

Disc one 
 "Carpet of the Sun" (Michael Dunford, Betty Newsinger) - 3:49
 "Opening Out" (Jon Camp, Dunford) - 4:24
 "Midas Man" (Dunford, Newsinger) - 6:31
 "Lady from Tuscany" (Dunford, Annie Haslam) - 7:07
 "Pearls of Wisdom" (Dunford, Haslam) - 4:41
 "Dear Landseer" (Dunford, Haslam) - 5:40
 "Northern Lights" (Dunford, Newsinger) - 4:21
 "Moonlight Shadow" (Mike Oldfield) - 4:08
 "Precious One" (Dunford, Haslam) - 4:48
 "Ananda" (Haslam, Rave Tesar) - 5:42

Disc two 
 "Mother Russia" (Dunford, Newsinger) - 10:31
 "Trip to the Fair" (Dunford, Newsinger, John Tout) - 11:53
 "One Thousand Roses" (Dunford, Haslam) - 7:53
 "I Think of You" (Dunford, Newsinger) - 3:20
 "Ashes Are Burning" (Dunford, Newsinger) - 19:57

Personnel

Renaissance
 Annie Haslam - lead vocals, producer
 Michael Dunford - acoustic guitar, backing vocals
 Mickey Simmonds - keyboards, backing vocals
 Rave Tesar - piano, keyboards, producer, mixing, mastering
 David J. Keyes - bass, backing vocals
 Terence Sullivan - drums, percussion

Production
Yoshiuki Tsuboi - recording engineer
Tomomi Shimura - assistant engineer
Masa Matsuzaki, Takayuki Watanabe - recording producers
Ken DiMaio, Live Sound Engineer

References 

Renaissance (band) albums
2002 live albums